The Crăciun is a right tributary of the river Drăgan in Romania. It flows into the Drăgan upstream from the Drăgan-Floroiu Reservoir.

References

Rivers of Romania
Rivers of Bihor County
Rivers of Cluj County